This is a list of museums in Kazakhstan.

Museums in Kazakhstan 

 National Museum of the Republic of Kazakhstan
 Central State Museum of the Republic of Kazakhstan
 Kazakhstan National Museum of Instruments
 A. Kasteyev State Museum of Arts
 Archaeological Museum of the Kazakhstan National Academy of Sciences
 State Book Museum
 Geology Museum of the Academy of Science
 Nature Museum of the Republic of Kazakhstan
 Zharkent Mosque, Architectural and Art Museum
 Zh. Zhabayev Literary Museum
 Altyn-Yemel State Memorial Shokan Valikhanov Museum
 M. Tynyshhayev Historical Museum of the Almaty Region
 Almaty History Museum
 Abai Museum
 Umai Art Museum
 Auezov Home Museum
 Kunaev Home Museum
 Baitursynov Home Museum
Tlendiyev Memorial Museum
Kasteev Home Museum
Satbayev Memorial Museum
I. Zhansugurov Literary Museum

See also 
 List of museums

External links 	
 Museums of Kazakhstan

Museums
 
Museums
Kazakhstan
Museums
Kazakhstan
Kazakhstan